The Austrian Association for Practical Shooting, German Österreichische Vereinigung für Praktisches Schiessen is the Austrian association for practical shooting under the International Practical Shooting Confederation.

See also 
IPSC Austrian Handgun Championship

External links 
 Official homepage of the Austrian Association for Practical Shooting

References 

Regions of the International Practical Shooting Confederation
Sports organisations of Austria